In geometry, a focaloid  is a shell bounded by two concentric, confocal ellipses (in 2D) or ellipsoids (in 3D). When the thickness of the shell becomes negligible, it is called a thin focaloid.

Mathematical definition (3D)
If one boundary surface is given by

 

with semiaxes a, b, c the second surface is given by

 

The thin focaloid is then given by the limit .

In general, a focaloid could be understood as a shell consisting out of two closed coordinate surfaces of a confocal ellipsoidal coordinate system.

Confocal
Confocal ellipsoids share the same foci, which are given for the example above by

Physical significance 
A focaloid can be used as a construction element of a matter or charge distribution. The particular importance of focaloids lies in the fact that two different but confocal focaloids of the same mass or charge produce the same action on a test mass or charge in the exterior region.

See also 
 Homoeoid
 Confocal conic sections

References

Subrahmanyan Chandrasekhar (1969): Ellipsoidal Figures of Equilibrium.  Yale University Press, London, Connecticut
Routh, E. J.: A Treatise on Analytical Statics, Vol II, Cambridge University Press, Cambridge (1882).

External links

Surfaces
Potential theory